The 1920 Connaught Cup was the Canadian National Challenge Cup for soccer that year.

Ontario Cup

Final

1920
Connaught Cup
Connaught Cup